James LeRoy Giles (June 16, 1863 – May 3, 1946) was the twenty-second Mayor of Orlando from 1916 to 1919. He was later elected to two non-consecutive terms in office. He also served as an alternate delegate to the Democratic National Convention from Florida in the 1912 United States Presidential Election.

Biography
James Giles was born in Zellwood in Orange County, Florida, on June 16, 1863. His father was the Reverend Enoch H. Giles (1836–1908) and his mother was Nellie B. Giles (1847–1917). He died on May 3, 1946, in Orlando, Florida.

His niece Edna Giles Fuller would eventually become the first woman elected to the Florida House of Representatives.

References

Mayors of Orlando, Florida
1863 births
1946 deaths
Florida Democrats